Mesosa poecila is a species of beetle in the family Cerambycidae. It was described by Henry Walter Bates in 1884. It is known from Japan.

References

poecila
Beetles described in 1884